The 2021–22 Boston Celtics season was the 76th season of the franchise in the National Basketball Association (NBA). Following the Celtics' first-round exit to the Brooklyn Nets in five games from last season, Danny Ainge left his role as the General Manager. Brad Stevens got promoted as the next President of Basketball Operations soon after. The Celtics hired Ime Udoka as the next head coach on June 28, 2021, in what was his only season as head coach before he was suspended for violating team rules and later replaced midway through the next season.

The Celtics began the season with a 18–21 record, but began a turnaround in January and finished with a 51–31 record and the number two seed in the Eastern Conference. With the Portland Trail Blazers missing the postseason for the first time since 2013, the Celtics now hold the longest active playoff streak, with consecutive appearances since 2015. They won the Atlantic Division for the first time since 2017.

In the first round of the playoffs, the Celtics swept the Brooklyn Nets in four games which was their third series sweep in 4 seasons. In the second round, they faced the defending champion Milwaukee Bucks for the third time in five seasons, defeating them in seven games. In the final game of the series, the Celtics made 22 3-pointers, a record for most ever in a playoff Game 7. The Celtics advanced to the Conference Finals for the fourth time in six years to play the top-seeded Miami Heat. In the previous two Conference Finals matchups between the two teams, the Celtics lost both times: in 2012 in seven games and in 2020 in six. This time, they beat the Heat in seven games—including three wins on the road—to advance to the 2022 NBA Finals, their first Finals appearance since 2010. They faced the Golden State Warriors in a rematch of the 1964 Finals, which the Celtics won in five games in an attempt to win their 18th championship and first since 2008. However, the Celtics would lose in six games despite taking a 2–1 lead.

Draft picks

The Celtics currently carry one second-round pick in the draft.

Roster

Standings

Division

Conference

Game log

Preseason

|-style="background:#cfc;"
| 1
| October 4
| Orlando
| 
| Jaylen Brown (25)
| Jayson Tatum (9)
| Payton Pritchard (5)
| TD Garden19,156
| 1–0
|-style="background:#cfc;"
| 2
| October 9
| Toronto
| 
| Jayson Tatum (20)
| Enes Kanter (10)
| Smart, Tatum (9)
| TD Garden19,156
| 2–0
|-style="background:#fcc;"
| 3
| October 13
| @ Orlando
| 
| Aaron Nesmith (23)
| Robert Williams III (7)
| Nesmith, G. Williams (4)
| Amway Center13,519
| 2–1
|-style="background:#fcc;"
| 4
| October 15
| @ Miami
| 
| Jayson Tatum (23)
| Jayson Tatum (8)
| Dennis Schröder (6)
| FTX Arena19,600
| 2–2

Regular season

|-style="background:#fcc;"
| 1
| October 20
| @ New York
|  
| Jaylen Brown (46)
| Jayson Tatum (11)
| Brown, Smart (6)
| Madison Square Garden19,812
| 0–1
|-style="background:#fcc;"
| 2
| October 22
| Toronto
|  
| Jayson Tatum (18)
| Al Horford (11)
| Marcus Smart (5)
| TD Garden19,156
| 0–2
|-style="background:#cfc;"
| 3
| October 24
| @ Houston
| 
| Jayson Tatum (31)
| Al Horford (10)
| Schröder, Smart (5)
| Toyota Center16,069
| 1–2
|-style="background:#cfc;"
| 4
| October 25
| @ Charlotte
| 
| Jayson Tatum (41)
| Robert Williams III (16) 
| Schröder, Tatum (8) 
| Spectrum Center17,238
| 2–2
|-style="background:#fcc;"
| 5
| October 27
| Washington
| 
| Jayson Tatum (23)
| Horford, Williams (11)
| Dennis Schroder (6)
| TD Garden19,156
| 2–3
|-style="background:#fcc;"
| 6
| October 30
| @ Washington
| 
| Jaylen Brown (34)
| Jayson Tatum (15)
| Dennis Schröder (9)
| Capital One Arena15,813
| 2–4

|-style="background:#fcc;"
| 7
| November 1
| Chicago
| 
| Jaylen Brown (28)
| Al Horford (10)
| Dennis Schröder (5)
| TD Garden19,156
| 2–5
|-style="background:#cfc;"
| 8
| November 3
| @ Orlando
| 
| Jaylen Brown (28)
| Al Horford (12)
| Al Horford (7)
| Amway Center12,735
| 3–5
|-style="background:#cfc;"
| 9
| November 4
| @ Miami
| 
| Jaylen Brown (17)
| Robert Williams III (10)
| Dennis Schröder (6)
| FTX Arena19,600
| 4–5
|-style="background:#fcc;"
| 10
| November 6
| @ Dallas
| 
| Jayson Tatum (32)
| Jayson Tatum (11)
| Smart, Schröder (6)
| American Airlines Center20,052
| 4–6
|-style="background:#cfc;"
| 11
| November 10
| Toronto
| 
| Jayson Tatum (22)
| Robert Williams III (13)
| Jayson Tatum (7)
| TD Garden19,156
| 5–6
|-style="background:#cfc;"
| 12
| November 12
| Milwaukee
| 
| Dennis Schröder (38)
| Robert Williams III (10)
| Marcus Smart (6)
| TD Garden19,156
| 6–6
|-style="background:#fcc;"
| 13
| November 13
| @ Cleveland
| 
| Dennis Schröder (28)
| Robert Williams III (16)
| Marcus Smart (8)
| Rocket Mortgage FieldHouse19,432
| 6–7
|-style="background:#cfc;"
| 14
| November 15
| @ Cleveland
| 
| Jayson Tatum (23)
| Al Horford (9)
| Smart, Tatum (5)
| Rocket Mortgage FieldHouse17,186
| 7–7
|-style="background:#fcc;"
| 15
| November 17
| @ Atlanta
| 
| Jayson Tatum (34)
| Jayson Tatum (9)
| Marcus Smart (11)
| State Farm Arena16,445
| 7–8
|-style="background:#cfc;"
| 16
| November 19
| L.A. Lakers
| 
| Jayson Tatum (37)
| Jayson Tatum (11)
| Schröder, Smart (6)
| TD Garden19,156
| 8–8
|-style="background:#cfc;"
| 17
| November 20
| Oklahoma City
| 
| Jayson Tatum (33)
| Al Horford (11)
| Marcus Smart (8)
| TD Garden19,156
| 9–8
|-style="background:#cfc;"
| 18
| November 22
| Houston
| 
| Jayson Tatum (30)
| Robert Williams III (15)
| Marcus Smart (5)
| TD Garden19,156
| 10–8
|-style="background:#fcc;"
| 19
| November 24
| Brooklyn
| 
| Marcus Smart (20)
| Jayson Tatum (8)
| Marcus Smart (8)
| TD Garden19,156
| 10–9
|-style="background:#fcc;"
| 20
| November 26
| @ San Antonio
| 
| Jayson Tatum (24)
| Jayson Tatum (12)
| Marcus Smart (8)
| AT&T Center15,360
| 10–10
|-style="background:#cfc;"
| 21
| November 28
| @ Toronto
| 
| Marcus Smart (21)
| Al Horford (11)
| Jayson Tatum (10)
| Scotiabank Arena19,800
| 11–10

|-style="background:#cfc;"
| 22
| December 1
| Philadelphia
| 
| Jayson Tatum (26)
| Jayson Tatum (16)
| Marcus Smart (8)
| TD Garden19,156
| 12–10
|-style="background:#fcc;"
| 23
| December 3
| @ Utah
| 
| Jayson Tatum (37)
| Horford, Tatum (6) 
| Al Horford (9)
| Vivint Arena18,306
| 12–11
|-style="background:#cfc;"
| 24
| December 4
| @ Portland
| 
| Schröder, Tatum (31)
| Enes Freedom (15)
| Dennis Schröder (8)
| Moda Center18,193
| 13–11
|-style="background:#fcc;"
| 25
| December 7
| @ L.A. Lakers
| 
| Jayson Tatum (34)
| Horford, Tatum (8)
| Marcus Smart (6)
| Staples Center18,997
| 13–12
|-style="background:#fcc;"
| 26
| December 8
| @ L.A. Clippers
| 
| Jayson Tatum (29)
| Jayson Tatum (10)
| Dennis Schröder (8)
| Staples Center17,064
| 13–13
|-style="background:#fcc;"
| 27
| December 10
| @ Phoenix
| 
| Jayson Tatum (24)
| Langford, Tatum (7)
| Horford, Pritchard, Schröder, Tatum (4) 
| Footprint Center17,071
| 13–14
|-style="background:#cfc;"
| 28
| December 13
| Milwaukee
| 
| Jayson Tatum (42)
| G. Williams, R. Williams III (7)
| Marcus Smart (11)
| TD Garden19,156
| 14–14
|-style="background:#fcc;"
| 29
| December 17
| Golden State
| 
| Jayson Tatum (27)
| Robert Williams III (11)
| Marcus Smart (8)
| TD Garden19,156
| 14–15
|-style="background:#cfc;"
| 30
| December 18
| New York
| 
| Josh Richardson (27)
| Jayson Tatum (9)
| Brown, Smart (5)
| TD Garden19,156
| 15–15
|-style="background:#fcc;"
| 31
| December 20
| Philadelphia
| 
| Jaylen Brown (30)
| Enes Freedom (11)
| Jayson Tatum (6)
| TD Garden19,156
| 15–16
|-style="background:#cfc;"
| 32
| December 22
| Cleveland
| 
| Jaylen Brown (34) 
| Robert Williams III (11)
| Robert Williams III (7)
| TD Garden19,156
| 16–16
|-style="background:#fcc;"
| 33
| December 25
| @ Milwaukee
| 
| Brown, Tatum (25)
| Robert Williams III (14)
| Marcus Smart (7)
| Fiserv Forum17,341
| 16–17
|-style="background:#fcc;"
| 34
| December 27
| @ Minnesota
| 
| Jaylen Brown (26)
| Robert Williams III (11) 
| Horford, Pritchard (6)
| Target Center15,962
| 16–18
|-style="background:#fcc;"
| 35
| December 29
| L.A. Clippers
| 
| Jaylen Brown (30)
| Robert Williams III (14)
| Al Horford (8)
| TD Garden19,156
| 16–19
|-style="background:#cfc;"
| 36
| December 31
| Phoenix
| 
| Brown, Smart (24)
| Brown, Williams III (11)
| Robert Williams III (10)
| TD Garden19,156
| 17–19

|-style="background:#cfc;"
| 37
| January 2
| Orlando
| 
| Jaylen Brown (50)
| Jaylen Brown (11)
| Schröder, Smart (7)
| TD Garden19,156
| 18–19
|-style="background:#fcc;"
| 38
| January 5
| San Antonio
| 
| Jaylen Brown (30)
| Robert Williams III (9)
| Marcus Smart (6)
| TD Garden19,156
| 18–20
|-style="background:#fcc;"
| 39
| January 6
| @ New York
| 
| Jayson Tatum (36)
| Robert Williams III (9)
| Jayson Tatum (9)
| Madison Square Garden17,529
| 18–21
|-style="background:#cfc;"
| 40
| January 8
| New York
| 
| Jaylen Brown (22)
| Jaylen Brown (11)
| Jaylen Brown (11)
| TD Garden19,156
| 19–21
|-style="background:#cfc;"
| 41
| January 10
| Indiana
| 
| Jaylen Brown (26)
| Jaylen Brown (15)
| Jaylen Brown (6)
| TD Garden19,156
| 20–21
|-style="background:#cfc;"
| 42
| January 12
| @ Indiana
| 
| Jaylen Brown (34)
| Robert Williams III (9)
| three players 4
| Gainbridge Fieldhouse13,560
| 21–21
|-style="background:#fcc;"
| 43
| January 14
| @ Philadelphia
| 
| Jaylen Brown (21)
| Robert Williams III (14)
| Jayson Tatum (5)
| Wells Fargo Center20,444
| 21–22
|-style="background:#cfc;"
| 44
| January 15
| Chicago
| 
| Jayson Tatum (23)
| Robert Williams III (13)
| Dennis Schröder (8)
| TD Garden19,156
| 22–22
|-style="background:#cfc;"
| 45
| January 17
| New Orleans
| 
| Jayson Tatum (27)
| Brown, Tatum (8)
| Dennis Schröder (9)
| TD Garden19,156
| 23–22
|-style="background:#fcc;"
| 46
| January 19
| Charlotte
| 
| Dennis Schröder (24)
| Al Horford (10)
| Jaylen Brown (6)
| TD Garden19,156
| 23–23
|-style="background:#fcc;"
| 47
| January 21
| Portland
|  
| Jayson Tatum (27)
| Tatum, Williams III (10)
| Jayson Tatum (7)
| TD Garden19,156
| 23–24
|-style="background:#cfc;"
| 48
| January 23
| @ Washington
| 
| Jayson Tatum (51)
| Brown, Tatum (10)
| Jayson Tatum (7)
| Capital One Arena16,371
| 24–24
|-style="background:#cfc;"
| 49
| January 25
| Sacramento
| 
| Jayson Tatum (36)
| Robert Williams III (17)
| Marcus Smart (7)
| TD Garden19,156
| 25–24
|-style="background:#fcc;"
| 50
| January 28
| @ Atlanta
| 
| Jaylen Brown (26)
| Jaylen Brown (12) 
| Jayson Tatum (4)
| State Farm Arena16,932
| 25–25
|-style="background:#cfc;"
| 51
| January 29
| @ New Orleans
| 
| Jayson Tatum (38)
| Robert Williams III (16)
| Marcus Smart (12)
| Smoothie King Center16,168
| 26–25
|-style="background:#cfc;"
| 52
| January 31
| Miami
| 
| Jaylen Brown (29)
| Jayson Tatum (12)
| Marcus Smart (7)
| TD Garden19,156
| 27–25
|-

|-style="background:#cfc;"
| 53
| February 2
| Charlotte
| 
| Josh Richardson (23)
| Al Horford (12)
| Jayson Tatum (9)
| TD Garden19,156
| 28–25
|-style="background:#cfc;"
| 54
| February 4
| @ Detroit
| 
| Jayson Tatum (24) 
| Robert Williams III (11)
| Marcus Smart (6)
| Little Caesars Arena17,584
| 29–25
|-style="background:#cfc;"
| 55
| February 6
| @ Orlando
| 
| Jaylen Brown (26)
| Al Horford (11)
| Jayson Tatum (7)
| Amway Center14,402
| 30–25
|-style="background:#cfc;"
| 56
| February 8
| @ Brooklyn
| 
| Brown, Smart (22)
| Enes Freedom (12)
| Jaylen Brown (9)
| Barclays Center17,732
| 31–25
|-style="background:#cfc;"
| 57
| February 11
| Denver
| 
| Jayson Tatum (24)  
| Robert Williams III (16)
| Marcus Smart (7) 
| TD Garden 19,156
| 32–25
|-style="background:#cfc;"
| 58
| February 13
| Atlanta
| 
| Jayson Tatum (38) 
| Robert Williams III (14)
| Marcus Smart (7)
| TD Garden19,156
| 33–25
|-style="background:#cfc;"
| 59
| February 15
| @ Philadelphia
| 
| Jaylen Brown (29)
| Jayson Tatum (12)
| Payton Pritchard (7)
| Wells Fargo Center20,960
| 34–25
|-style="background:#fcc;"
| 60
| February 16
| Detroit
| 
| Jaylen Brown (31)
| Al Horford (7)
| Al Horford (7)
| TD Garden19,156
| 34–26
|- align="center"
| colspan="9" style="background:#bbcaff;" | All-Star Break
|-style="background:#cfc;"
| 61
| February 24
| @ Brooklyn
| 
| Jayson Tatum (30) 
| Al Horford (13)
| Jaylen Brown (6)
| Barclays Center17,986
| 35–26
|-style="background:#cfc;"
| 62
| February 26
| @ Detroit
|  
| Jaylen Brown (27) 
| Jayson Tatum (11)
| Marcus Smart (7)
| Little Caesars Arena19,122
| 36–26
|-style="background:#fcc;"
| 63
| February 27
| @ Indiana
| 
| Jayson Tatum (24) 
| Robert Williams III (11)
| Jaylen Brown (8)
| Gainbridge Fieldhouse16,872
| 36–27

|-style="background:#cfc;"
| 64
| March 1
| Atlanta
| 
| Jayson Tatum (33)
| Robert Williams III (13)
| Jayson Tatum (7)
| TD Garden19,156
| 37–27
|-style="background:#cfc;"
| 65
| March 3
| Memphis
| 
| Jayson Tatum (37)
| Al Horford (15)
| Marcus Smart (12)
| TD Garden19,156
| 38–27
|-style="background:#cfc;"
| 66
| March 6
| Brooklyn
| 
| Jayson Tatum (54)
| Robert Williams III (8)
| Marcus Smart (9)
| TD Garden19,156
| 39–27 
|-style="background:#cfc;"
| 67
| March 9
| @ Charlotte
| 
| Jayson Tatum (44)
| Robert Williams III (11)
| Marcus Smart (9)
| Spectrum Center18,086
| 40–27
|-style="background:#cfc;"
| 68
| March 11
| Detroit
| 
| Jayson Tatum (31)
| Robert Williams III (9)
| Jayson Tatum (6)
| TD Garden19,156
| 41–27
|-style="background:#fcc;"
| 69
| March 13
| Dallas
| 
| Jayson Tatum (21) 
| Jayson Tatum (11)
| Brown, Smart, Tatum (4)
| TD Garden19,156
| 41–28
|-style="background:#cfc;"
| 70
| March 16
| @ Golden State
| 
| Jayson Tatum (26)
| Jayson Tatum (12)
| Marcus Smart (8)
| Chase Center18,064
| 42–28
|-style="background:#cfc;"
| 71
| March 18 
| @ Sacramento
| 
| Jayson Tatum (32)
| Al Horford (9)
| Payton Pritchard (8)
| Golden 1 Center15,313
| 43–28
|-style="background:#cfc;"
| 72
| March 20
| @ Denver
| 
| Jayson Tatum (30)
| Robert Williams III (9)
| Jayson Tatum (7)
| Ball Arena19,602
| 44–28
|-style="background:#cfc;"
| 73
| March 21
| @ Oklahoma City
| 
| Jayson Tatum (36)
| Grant Williams (10)
| Al Horford (7)
| Paycom Center15,345
| 45–28
|-style="background:#cfc;"
| 74
| March 23
| Utah
| 
| Jaylen Brown (26)
| Robert Williams III (10)
| Marcus Smart (13)
| TD Garden19,156
| 46–28
|-style="background:#cfc;"
| 75
| March 27
| Minnesota
| 
| Jayson Tatum (34)
| Jaylen Brown (10)
| Marcus Smart (7)
| TD Garden19,156
| 47–28
|-style="background:#fcc;"
| 76
| March 28 
| @ Toronto
| 
| Marcus Smart (28)
| Marcus Smart (10)
| Derrick White (8)
| Scotiabank Arena19,800
| 47–29
|-style="background:#fcc;"
| 77
| March 30
| Miami
| 
| Jaylen Brown (28)
| Al Horford (15)
| Marcus Smart (8)
| TD Garden19,156
| 47–30
|-

|-style="background:#cfc;"
| 78
| April 1
| Indiana
| 
| Jaylen Brown (32)
| Al Horford (10)
| Jaylen Brown (7)
| TD Garden19,156
| 48–30
|-style="background:#cfc;"
| 79
| April 3
| Washington
| 
| Jaylen Brown (32)
| Al Horford (8)
| Smart, Tatum (7)
| TD Garden19,156
| 49–30
|-style="background:#cfc;"
| 80
| April 6
| @ Chicago
| 
| Jaylen Brown (25)
| Al Horford (10)
| Jayson Tatum (8)
| United Center21,095
| 50–30
|-style="background:#fcc;"
| 81
| April 7
| @ Milwaukee
| 
| Marcus Smart (29)
| Jaylen Brown (10)
| Jaylen Brown (11)
| Fiserv Forum18,046
| 50–31
|-style="background:#cfc;"
| 82
| April 10
| @ Memphis
| 
| Jayson Tatum (31)
| Daniel Theis (10)
| Marcus Smart (6)
| FedExForum17,441
| 51–31

Playoffs

|-style="background:#cfc;"
| 1
| April 17
| Brooklyn
| 
| Jayson Tatum (31)
| Al Horford (15)
| Jayson Tatum (8)
| TD Garden19,156
| 1–0
|-style="background:#cfc;"
| 2
| April 20
| Brooklyn
| 
| Jaylen Brown (22)
| Tatum, Horford, Theis, Williams (6)
| Jayson Tatum (10)
| TD Garden19,156
| 2–0
|-style="background:#cfc;"
| 3
| April 23
| @ Brooklyn
| 
| Jayson Tatum (39)
| White, Theis (6)
| Tatum, Smart (6)
| Barclays Center18,175
| 3–0
|-style="background:#cfc;"
| 4
| April 25
| @ Brooklyn
| 
| Jayson Tatum (29)
| Jaylen Brown (8)
| Marcus Smart (11)
| Barclays Center18,099
| 4–0

|-style="background:#fcc;"
| 1
| May 1
| Milwaukee
| 
| Jayson Tatum (21)
| Al Horford (10)
| Smart, Tatum (6)
| TD Garden19,156
| 0–1
|-style="background:#cfc;"
| 2
| May 3
| Milwaukee
| 
| Jaylen Brown (30)
| Al Horford (11)
| Jayson Tatum (8)
| TD Garden19,156
| 1–1
|-style="background:#fcc;"
| 3
| May 7
| @ Milwaukee
| 
| Jaylen Brown (27)
| Al Horford (16)
| Al Horford (5)
| Fiserv Forum17,736
| 1–2
|-style="background:#cfc;"
| 4
| May 9
| @ Milwaukee
| 
| Horford, Tatum (30)
| Jayson Tatum (13)
| Marcus Smart (8)
| Fiserv Forum17,505
| 2–2
|-style="background:#fcc;"
| 5
| May 11
| Milwaukee
| 
| Jayson Tatum (34)
| Brown, Horford (8)
| Brown, Horford, White (6)
| TD Garden19,156
| 2–3
|-style="background:#cfc;"
| 6
| May 13
| @ Milwaukee
| 
| Jayson Tatum (46)
| Al Horford (10)
| Marcus Smart (7)
| Fiserv Forum17,681
| 3–3
|-style="background:#cfc;"
| 7
| May 15
| Milwaukee
| 
| Grant Williams (27)
| Al Horford (10)
| Marcus Smart (10)
| TD Garden19,156
| 4–3

|-style="background:#fcc;"
| 1
| May 17
| @ Miami
| 
| Jayson Tatum (29)
| Jaylen Brown (10)
| Jayson Tatum (6)
| FTX Arena19,774
| 0–1
|-style="background:#cfc;"
| 2
| May 19
| @ Miami
| 
| Jayson Tatum (27)
| Marcus Smart (9)
| Marcus Smart (12)
| FTX Arena20,100
| 1-1
|-style="background:#fcc;"
| 3
| May 21
| Miami
| 
| Jaylen Brown (40)
| Al Horford (14)
| Marcus Smart (7)
| TD Garden19,156
| 1-2
|-style="background:#cfc;"
| 4
| May 23
| Miami
| 
| Jayson Tatum (31) 
| Al Horford (13)
| Derrick White (6)
| TD Garden19,156
| 2–2
|-style="background:#cfc;"
| 5
| May 25
| @ Miami
| 
| Jaylen Brown (25)
| Jayson Tatum (12) 
| Jayson Tatum (9) 
| FTX Arena19,819
| 3–2
|-style="background:#fcc;"
| 6
| May 27
| Miami
| 
| Jayson Tatum (30)
| Horford Tatum (9)
| Brown, Horford, White (5)
| TD Garden19,156
| 3–3
|-style="background:#cfc;"
| 7
| May 29
| @ Miami
| 
| Jayson Tatum (26)
| Al Horford (13)
| Brown Tatum (6)
| FTX Arena20,200
| 4–3

|-style="background:#cfc;"
| 1
| June 2
| @ Golden State
| 
| Al Horford (26)
| Jaylen Brown (7)
| Jayson Tatum (13) 
| Chase Center18,064
| 1–0
|-style="background:#fcc;"
| 2
| June 5
| @ Golden State
| 
| Jayson Tatum (28)
| Al Horford (8)
| Marcus Smart (5)
| Chase Center18,064
| 1–1
|-style="background:#cfc;"
| 3
| June 8
| Golden State
| 
| Jaylen Brown (27)
| Robert Williams III (10)
| Jayson Tatum (9)
| TD Garden19,156
| 2–1
|-style="background:#fcc;"
| 4
| June 10
| Golden State
| 
| Jayson Tatum (23)
| Robert Williams III (12)
| Jayson Tatum (6)
| TD Garden19,156
| 2–2
|-style="background:#fcc;"
| 5
| June 13
| @ Golden State
| 
| Jayson Tatum (27)
| Jayson Tatum (10)
| Tatum, Brown (4)
| Chase Center18,064
| 2–3
|-style="background:#fcc;"
| 6
| June 16
| Golden State
| 
| Jaylen Brown (34)
| Al Horford (14)
| Marcus Smart (9)
| TD Garden19,156
| 24

Transactions

Trades

Free agency

Additions

Subtractions

Notes

References

Boston Celtics seasons
Boston Celtics
Boston Celtics
Boston Celtics
Celtics
Celtics
Eastern Conference (NBA) championship seasons